Higher Ground is the 20th studio album by American singer-songwriter John Denver. Released in September 1988, it was his first studio album on the Windstar label.  It was recorded at Denver's private studio in Snowmass, Colorado, with the exception of "For You" and the didjeridu part in "Sing Australia." These were recorded in Sydney. The album shares its title with Denver's television movie "Higher Ground", which uses the album's title song as its opening theme.

Two charting singles were released from the LP, "For You," a Top 40 hit in Australia, and "Country Girl in Paris," a minor hit in the U.S.  The album also includes a cover of Guy Clark's song "Homegrown Tomatoes," a 1981 US Country hit.

Track listing
All tracks composed by John Denver; except where indicated

Side one
 "Higher Ground" (Denver, Lee Holdridge, Joe Henry)
 "Homegrown Tomatoes" (Guy Clark)
 "Whispering Jesse"
 "Never a Doubt"
 "Deal with the Ladies"
 "Sing Australia"

Side two
 "A Country Girl in Paris"
 "For You"
 "All This Joy" (Denver, Glen D. Hardin)
 "Falling Leaves (The Refugees)"
 "Bread & Roses" (Mimi Fariña, Jim Oppenheim)
 "Alaska & Me"

Chart performance

Album

Singles

Personnel
John Denver – guitar, vocals
Daryl Burgess - drums
James Burton – guitar
Glen Hardin – piano
Jim Horn - saxophone, flute, recorder
Richard Mellick – piano on "For You"
Jerry Scheff – bass
Lee Holdridge – string arrangements
Danny Wheatman – mandolin, fiddle, harmonica
Christy O'Leary – uilleann pipes
Arthur Lazenby – banjo
Alf Clausen – string arrangements
Strings Plus – orchestra
Jim McGillveray – percussion
Charlie McMahon – didjeridu

References

John Denver albums
1988 albums
Albums arranged by Lee Holdridge
Albums produced by Roger Nichols (recording engineer)